Brooke Ellen Bollea (born May 5, 1988), better known by her stage name Brooke Hogan, is an American television personality, singer, and actress. The daughter of professional wrestler Hulk Hogan, she at one point served as an on-screen personality for Impact Wrestling.

Brooke took an early interest in music, and began working on her first studio album in 2002. In an attempt to promote her music career, Hogan and her father appeared in a one-hour special on VH1. The special proved to be a ratings success, leading to Hogan and her family starring in the reality television series Hogan Knows Best (2005–07). The show saw a then teenage Brooke struggling with her overprotective father and recording her debut album. Her first studio album, Undiscovered, was released in 2006. It was preceded by the single "About Us", which entered the top-forty of the Billboard Hot 100 chart.

While Hogan began working on her second album, personal struggles among her family led to the cancellation of Hogan Knows Best. This led to Hogan starring in her own television series, Brooke Knows Best (2008–09). Though her parents and brother made numerous appearances throughout the series, it mainly focused on Brooke and the recording of her new music. Hogan's second studio album, The Redemption (2009), failed to match the success of its predecessor. The album spawned two singles, neither of which had much success. Following the conclusion of Brooke Knows Best, Hogan pursued a career in acting, making numerous appearances in low budget films and television shows. In 2012, Hogan signed on to appear on Total Nonstop Action Wrestling (TNA), alongside her father. She was released from the series after a year on the program. Hogan starred in the satire film L.A. Slasher (2015), and worked on two extended plays consisting of country music in 2015 and 2018.

Early life 
Brooke Ellen Bollea was born May 5, 1988, in Tampa, Florida, the older child of Hulk Hogan (Terry Gene Bollea) and Linda Claridge. She has one younger brother, Nick Hogan (Nick Bollea).

In high school, she took dance classes, voice lessons, piano lessons, and gymnastics. She joined the cheerleading squad of her Clearwater, Florida school, Clearwater Central Catholic High School, in her first year (though she only stayed at the school for the first half of first year). She also sang inhibitor chorus for CCCHS. Hogan graduated from high school at the age of sixteen.

Career

2002–05: Music beginnings and reality series 
Hogan was signed to Trans Continental Records in 2002. Some music was produced with LFO member Rich Cronin's assistance. The album's lead single, "Everything to Me", was released in July 2004. The song appeared at number one on the Hot 100 Singles Sales chart in the United States, and number 97 on the Billboard Hot 100. To promote the album, Hogan toured with Hilary Duff on her Most Wanted Tour throughout the US, as well as with the Backstreet Boys on their Up Close & Personal Tour, both of which took place from mid 2004 to early 2005. The album, Brooke Hogan: This Voice, was slated for a September 21, 2004 release date, but the album was not released.

Hogan and her father appeared in the hour-long profile (Inside) Out: Hulk Hogan, Stage Dad. The television special chronicled Hogan working on her debut album, as well as showed her father's role in the album making process. Her father later stated that the show was mainly an attempt to help promote Brooke and her upcoming music career. The special was a major success for the network, and the success of the special led to VH1 turning it into an entire television series, titled Hogan Knows Best. The series premiered in July 2005, and was the highest rated series in the network's history. The show chronicled the Hogan family's life together, although it mainly focused on Brooke and her father. Hogan Knows Best presented her father as strict with her dating. On the show, Hulk placed a GPS tracker on Brooke's vehicle that enabled him to track her whereabouts and shut down the engine of her car remotely. However, Brooke said in a later interview that her father loosened up after her eighteenth birthday.

2006–08: Undiscovered and Brooke Knows Best 
In 2006, Hogan changed record labels and became the first artist signed to Scott Storch's label, initially called Storchaveli Records, but later named Storch Music Company. She also signed with SoBe Entertainment. Storch also became the album's main producer. During an interview, Hogan stated that she was recording the album at The Hit Factory in Miami, Florida, where rapper Paul Wall heard a clip of the song "About Us" and asked to be on the song.

The lead single from the album, "About Us", was premiered on the season two finale of Hogan Knows Best. It quickly began receiving heavy radio rotation, and peaked at number 33 the Billboard Hot 100. Undiscovered was released on October 24, 2006 in the United States and Canada. The album debuted at number 28 on the Billboard 200, and number 1 on the Independent Albums charts in the US, selling an estimated 30,000 copies in its first week of release. The album has only sold an estimated 127,000 copies in the United States.

To help promote the album, Hogan appeared in the November 2006 edition of FHM, becoming the first FHM cover model under 21 years old. As a result, the November issue had no liquor advertising. Dana Leslie Fields, executive publisher and president of FHM, said: "In the very rare instance that you might have a cover star under the age of 21, they don't want to be in the position of seeming to market to anyone under age."

To further promote the album, Hogan announced its second single would be "Heaven Baby", which featured Beenie Man on guest vocals. The song was released to pop radio in January 2007. On March 6, "For A Moment" was released as a promotional single from the album, with a music video featuring clips of the third and fourth seasons of Hogan Knows Best. Hogan's record label decided the album should be re-released later in the year; however, Hogan decided against it, opting to begin work on her second album. In August 2007, Hogan confirmed that she would be departing from one of her labels, SMC, and soon confirmed that she had signed a dual contract with SoBe Entertainment and Fontana Records and was at work on her second album. Hogan appeared as a panel judge in America's Prom Queen in early 2008.

While working on her second studio album, the series Hogan Knows Best was discontinued due to controversies involving Brooke's immediate family. As a result, Brooke was approached by VH1 awhile thereafter and signed on to do her own series, Brooke Knows Best. The series premiered on July 13, 2008, and featured Hogan dealing with her family's problems, her music career, and her life while no longer living with her parents nor dependent on them. The show consisted of her friends, Glenn and Ashley – who are often encouraging Brooke to get out, have fun, and party. Brooke, Glenn, and Ashley live in a penthouse in South Beach, which is paid for by VH1. The show chronicled the problems Brooke faced while dealing with the divorce of her parents, as well as brother Nick Hogan's prior arrest related to a serious car accident in which he permanently injured his best friend. Hogan's father has appeared in numerous episodes of the series, while her mother and brother have made a few. The series ended in 2009 after two seasons.

2009–present: The Redemption and film debut 

In early 2009, Hogan announced the title of her second album to be The Redemption. The album's lead single, "Falling", featured rapper Stacks, and was released on March 31, 2009. On June 30, Hogan released the album's second single, "Hey Yo!", which featured Colby O'Donis on guest vocals. On July 4, Hogan released a mixtape, titled "Judgement Day", to help promote the release of the album. The mixtape caused a buzz online after the song 'Ur Not That Hot' was seen as a diss toward The Hills star, and fellow pop singer, Heidi Montag. The song also includes a fake voicemail that Hogan implies was sent to her from Montag. The Redemption was released on July 21 in the US and Canada for digital download and as a physical copy. It debuted at number 144 on the Billboard 200, and 27 on the Independent Albums chart, selling 3,381 copies in its first week. She was released from her four-year contract with SoBe Entertainment a year early after the promotion for the album concluded. She is now only signed to Fontana Records. To date, she is the only artist signed to the label. Hogan completed a second season of Brooke Knows Best on August 9, 2009. The show would not return to the air after the second season. She also had a small part in the pilot episode of The Jeff Dunham Show.

In November 2009 Hogan was featured in Toni Braxton's music video for "Yesterday". In late 2009, Hogan made her first film appearance in the low budget live action film Little Hercules in 3D, which was only released in certain territories outside of the US. It was released on October 8, 2009 in Kazakhstan and Russia, and in the Czech Republic on January 7, 2010. Hogan's mother, father, and brother also appear in various roles in the film.

Hogan appeared as Kate in the Science fiction film 2 Headed Shark Attack, which was released on January 17, 2012 in the United States. She also appeared as Sandy Powers in the film "Sand Sharks", which was released on January 9 in the United Kingdom. She also guest starred in "The Dean's List", the March 4, 2012 episode of China, IL.

She confirmed on June 12, 2014 via her official Instagram account, that her new single would be called "Beautiful" and set a release date for fall of 2014. On July 13, 2015, Hogan released her first alternative country track titled "Girlfriend" on iTunes. In September 2015 Hogan released her first extended play ‘I Wanna Be Your Girlfriend’. In 2018 she released a follow up EP ‘So Many Summers’. On November 1, 2019, Hogan released her newest pop single titled "Touch My Body." An accompanying music video was released a week later on November 8, 2019.

Professional wrestling career

World Wrestling Entertainment (2006) 

Brooke made her WWE debut on the July 15, 2006 episode of Saturday Night's Main Event XXXIII, appearing with her father. Randy Orton came out and flirted with Brooke then challenged Hulk to a match at SummerSlam. Later in the parking lot after more flirting, Brooke got in their car and was unaware Orton would RKO Hulk. Orton would later appear on WWE Raw with a fake Hogan family and kissed the fake Brooke.

Total Nonstop Action Wrestling (2012–2013) 
On May 17, 2012, Total Nonstop Action Wrestling (TNA), the wrestling promotion where her father worked, announced that Brooke had signed on to work in the promotion as an on-screen authority figure and a backstage consultant to the TNA Knockouts.

In July 2012, Brooke confirmed via her official Twitter account, that she has continued to write and develop her third studio album. Throughout the mid-2012, she has been appearing on Total Nonstop Action Wrestling (TNA), weekly on Thursday nights to help promote the female's wrestling division. On the June 7 episode of Impact Wrestling, a week after Hogan's TNA debut, Hogan gave Mickie James, Tara, Velvet Sky and Miss Tessmacher (now changed back to Brooke Tessmacher) a chance in a four-way match to earn another shot at Gail Kim's TNA Women's Knockout Championship, which was won by Miss Tessmacher. In June 2012, Hogan gave Velvet Sky a part featured in Montgomery Gentry's music video for their song "So Called Life". On the June 21 episode of Impact Wrestling, Hogan chose James over Sky as the next challenger for the Women's Knockout Championship, but failed to recapture the title from Miss Tessmacher.

In July, Hulk Hogan, alongside Sting, began feuding with a mysterious group of masked men, who had dubbed themselves the Aces & Eights. The group's attack on Hulk Hogan on the July 12 episode of Impact Wrestling was used to write Hulk Hogan off the show, as he was set to undergo another back surgery. On the August 16, 2012 episode of Impact, Hogan hired Taryn Terrell, as the referee for the TNA Women's Knockout Championship match between Madison Rayne and Miss Tessmacher. In November, Hogan would move into a storyline with her father and Bully Ray after Austin Aries revealed a secret relationship between herself and Ray. After seeing them kissing in a parking garage on the December 20 episode of Impact Wrestling, Hulk suspended Ray indefinitely on the January 3, 2013, episode. The following week, after Ray saved Hogan from a kidnapping by the Aces & Eights, Hogan accepted his marriage proposal much to her father's dismay. The ceremony took place the next week on Impact Wrestling, where Ray's groomsman Tazz interrupted and revealed himself to be a member of Aces & Eights, leading to the group attacking Ray, Hulk Hogan, and the rest of the groomsmen. On the February 21 edition of Impact, after listening to Hogan plea, Hulk Hogan named Bully Ray the number one contender for the World Heavyweight Championship at Lockdown. At this event, Bully Ray would turn his back on Hogan and TNA by revealing himself as the President of the Aces & Eights. On the following episodes of Impact, Bully Ray touted the fact that the public bought into his deceptive act the entire time to earn the trust of Sting, Hogan, and Hulk Hogan as a way to get a chance to capture the TNA World Title. Hogan continued to seek a divorce from her husband and got it ending the storyline. On August 16, 2013 it was reported that Hogan had been released from TNA.

In October 2016, TMZ reported that Hogan was forming a female wrestling league called the Daughters of Wrestling, along with the daughters of Roddy Piper, Diamond Dallas Page, and Kerry Von Erich.

Personal life 
Hogan was engaged to former Dallas Cowboys center Phil Costa.
The engagement ended in November 2013.

In 2015, an audio recording (and its transcripts) of her father Hulk Hogan allegedly making comments about her and her choice of companionship in 2006 became the center of controversy that resulted in his contract with the WWE ending. Hulk Hogan's comments described himself as her ideal husband and that he would bring 'Hulkamania' on anyone who married his daughter. In response, she wrote a poem defending him.

Filmography

Television

Discography 
Studio albums

Mixtapes

Extended plays

Singles

References

External links 

1988 births
Living people
21st-century American actresses
21st-century American singers
21st-century American women singers
Actresses from Miami
Actresses from Tampa, Florida
American child singers
American dance musicians
American female models
American female professional wrestlers
American film actresses
American socialites
American television actresses
American women pop singers
Bollea family
Female models from Florida
Musicians from Miami
Musicians from Tampa, Florida
Professional wrestlers from Florida
Professional wrestling authority figures
Singers from Florida
The Challenge (TV series) contestants